Lieutenant-General Sir John Vaughan KB (c. 1731 – 30 June 1795), styled The Honourable from 1741, was a British soldier and a Member of Parliament in both the British and Irish Parliaments. During the American Revolutionary War he served in both the American and West Indies theaters.

Background and early career

Vaughan was the second son of the 3rd Viscount Lisburne. He began his military career as an officer in the 9th Marines, being commissioned as a second lieutenant in 1746; but he transferred to the 10th Dragoons as a cornet in 1748, being promoted to lieutenant in 1751, captain-lieutenant in 1754 and Major in 1759. In 1760 he became a Lieutenant-Colonel in the 94th Foot, and held the same rank in the 16th Foot from 1762. He served in both Germany and North America during the Seven Years' War, leading a division of grenadiers with great distinction at the capture of Martinique. In 1772 he was promoted to colonel, and from 1775 until his death was Colonel of the 46th Foot.

Member of Parliament

He entered the British Parliament in 1774 as member for Berwick-upon-Tweed, holding the seat for the remaining twenty years of his life. From 1776 to 1783, he was also a member of the Irish Parliament and represented St Johnstown (County Longford). He was appointed Governor of Fort William in 1779 and then, in 1780, as Governor of Berwick, also holding this post until his death, although it did not interfere with his active military career. He was a reliable supporter of the government when in the House of Commons, but of course could not attend while he was absent on active service: at the 1780 election the government's election managers considered trying to replace him temporarily as Berwick's MP by someone who would be able to attend and vote, but the borough's patrons would have none of it and he was returned unopposed.

American War of Independence

Following the outbreak of the American War of Independence Vaughan returned to North America as a Major-General, serving from 1776 until 1779. 

He led the grenadiers at the Battle of Long Island, and was wounded in the thigh; he commanded a column in the Battle of Short Hills, New Jersey, in July 1777, and he commanded a column during the successful assault on Fort Clinton and Fort Montgomery, where his horse was killed under him. 

In 1779, he returned to England but was immediately appointed Commander-in-Chief in the Leeward Islands

Fourth Anglo-Dutch War
Vaughan served in the West Indies from 1779 until 1782, taking a leading part in Rodney's Capture of St Eustatius in 1781, a successful campaign aimed at neutralizing the Dutch port which was used to store and send supplies to the American colonists during their Revolutionary War. Later in the year he was accused of embezzling the property confiscated at St Eustatius, and was forced to defend himself against Burke's attack in Parliament, stating that he had not profited by a shilling and had always acted in the national interest rather than his own. He was promoted to Lieutenant General in 1782.

Later life

1792, he was knighted as a Knight of the Bath (KB). In 1795 he was appointed once more to command in the Leeward Islands, but died later the same year at Martinique.

Citations

Sources
 
 Concise Dictionary of National Biography (1930)
Robert Beatson, A Chronological Register of Both Houses of Parliament (London: Longman, Hurst, Res & Orme, 1807) 
 Lewis Namier & John Brooke, The History of Parliament: The House of Commons 1754-1790 (London: HMSO, 1964)
 

1730s births
1795 deaths
10th Royal Hussars officers
46th Regiment of Foot officers
British Army generals
British MPs 1774–1780
British MPs 1780–1784
British MPs 1784–1790
British MPs 1790–1796
British Army personnel of the American Revolutionary War
Connaught Rangers officers
Irish MPs 1776–1783
Knights Companion of the Order of the Bath
Members of the Parliament of Great Britain for English constituencies
Members of the Parliament of Ireland (pre-1801) for County Longford constituencies
Younger sons of viscounts
British Army personnel of the Seven Years' War
Royal Marines officers
British Governors of Martinique
British military personnel of the Fourth Anglo-Dutch War
John